Bekir Refet Teker (May 22, 1899 – April 5, 1977) was a Turkish footballer. He played as a striker for Fenerbahçe and the Turkey national football team. Like most little boys from Kadıköy his career started in the Fenerbahçe youth teams until he was promoted to the senior team. Bekir then played for Altinordu, Galatasaray (in friendly matches only) and Karlsruhe in Germany. Bekir was a member of the Olympic squads of Turkey in 1924 and 1928.

When SK Slavia Prague team of the 1920s came to Turkey, Bekir scored the winning goal as Fener won the match 1–0.

Career statistics

International goals

References

1899 births
1977 deaths
Turkish footballers
Turkey international footballers
Fenerbahçe S.K. footballers
Olympic footballers of Turkey
Footballers at the 1924 Summer Olympics
Footballers at the 1928 Summer Olympics
Association football forwards
Footballers from Istanbul